Beautiful Show is the first world tour held by South Korean boy group Beast. The world tour kicked off in Seoul on February 4, 2012, and continued on February 12, 2012, in Germany.

History 

On December 26, 2011, it was announced during Cube Entertainment's "Cube Entertainment Vision Briefing" press conference that Beast will embark on a 14 countries, 21-city tour, which became a 10 city tour as shows were cancelled. They kicked off the tour in Seoul for two nights, then to Berlin. Shows in England (London), Spain, America (New York, Los Angeles, San Francisco), Canada (Vancouver, Toronto), two cities in Japan, Brazil, and the Philippines were cancelled.

On January 25, 2012, it was announced through a video that Beast shared through their official YouTube account that they would be cancelling "Beautiful Show" in Brazil and the United Kingdom.

Set list

Tour dates

External links
 Beast's official website
 (INFO) 2012 BEAST World Tour ‘Beautiful Show’, AlwaysBeast

References 

2012 concert tours
K-pop concerts